The Knife Angel (also referred to as the National Monument Against Violence & Aggression) is a contemporary sculpture formed of 100,000 knives created by artist Alfie Bradley and the British Ironworks Centre, based in Oswestry, England.

In order to create the sculpture, 200 knife banks were produced by the Ironworks and amnesties held for individuals to anonymously donate their knives. Knives seized by police were also included, some of which arrived in evidence tubes still with bodily fluids on their surface.

The sculpture was created in order to highlight knife crime in the United Kingdom and educate young people on the harmful effect violent behaviour can have on their communities.

Construction 
Once the knives were delivered to the British Ironworks Centre in Oswestry, Shropshire, each one was disinfected before being blunted. The knives were then welded onto an existing steel frame to form the body of the angel and remaining knives were welded onto steel plates to form the wings, giving a feather-like appearance.

Families who lost loved ones as a result of knife crime were invited to have a message engraved onto a blade used in the sculpture. Over 80 families contacted the artist in order to engrave a personal message on a blade used in the wings.

In 2014, early design stages of the Knife Angel are shown on the television show Escape to the Country where show host, Jules Hudson was allowed by artist, Alfie Bradley, to weld a WWII bayonet onto a metal plate as part of the project. The project was originally expected to be complete in 2015, as mentioned in the episode. Sketches of Alfie's Knife Angel are shown as well as his previous knife statues.

The National Anti-Violence UK Tour 
Following the completion of the sculpture in 2018 it began a nationwide tour in order to highlight the anti-violence message behind its construction.

The sculpture was on display in Corby Northamptonshire until 29 May 2022, and for the month of June was displayed in Aberystwyth.

The sculpture was on display outside the Grand Entrance to Birkenhead Park on the Wirral Peninsula for July 2022.

The sculpture was on display at Kirkleatham Museum, Redcar during August 2022.

The Knife Angel was situated in Newport, near Friars Walk, for the month of November 2022.

The Knife Angel was situated in Slough in January 2023 and is currently at Gloucester Cathedral for February 2023 and is due to be situated at Guildford Cathedral for March 1st to 30th 2023 .

References 

Sculptures in England
Metal sculptures
2018 sculptures
Knives
Sculptures of angels